Sven Authorsen (born 5 June 1967) is a German former competitive ice dancer. With Saskia Stähler, he is a two-time German national champion (1990–91). They qualified for the free dance at two European Championships, placing as high as 13th (1991), and also at the 1991 World Championships. Authorsen later competed with Yvonne Schulz.

Authorsen is a specialist in orthopedics and trauma surgery and has worked for the Deutsche Eislauf-Union.

Competitive highlights

With Schulz

With Stähler

References 

1967 births
German male ice dancers
Living people
People from Gütersloh
Sportspeople from Detmold (region)
20th-century German dancers
21st-century German dancers